Nowkar, also rendered as Nowkal and Naukal, may refer to:
 Nowkar-e Gazi
 Nowkar-e Mokhi